Veľký Slavkov is a village and municipality in Poprad District in the Prešov Region of northern Slovakia.

Geography
The municipality lies at an elevation of 677 metres (2,221 ft) and covers an area of 12.347 km² (4.767 mi²). It has a population of about 1,150.

History
In historical records the village was first mentioned in 1251. It belonged to a German language island. The German population was expelled in 1945.

Economy and infrastructure
Its proximity to High Tatras have developed the village as a tourist destination. In Velký Slavkov are several pensions and a hotel.

References

Villages and municipalities in Poprad District